No Mercy is the third studio album by the American rap group Da Youngsta's. It was released in September 20, 1994 under EastWest.

The album peaked at number 45 on the Top R&B/Hip hop albums.

Track listing 
 "Hip Hop Ride" (Q. Goodman, T. Goodman, T. Dawson, C. Harte) (4:19)
 "Mad Props" (Q. Goodman, T. Goodman, T. Dawson, C. Harte) (4:15) 
 "No Mercy" (Q. Goodman, T. Goodman, A. Goodman, T. Dawson, C. Harte) (4:26)
 "Backstabbers" (Q. Goodman, T. Goodman, A. Goodman, T. Dawson, C. Harte) (3:53)
 "No More Hard Times" (Q. Goodman, T. Goodman, A. Goodman, T. Dawson, C. Harte) (4:10)
 "Put Me On" (Q. Goodman, T. Goodman, A. Goodman, T. Dawson, A. Goodman) (4:29)
 "Stayed Away" (Q. Goodman, T. Goodman, A. Goodman, T. Dawson, A. Ross, L. Ware) (3:58)
 "Illy Filly Funk" (A. Goodman) (4:19)
 "Grim Reaper" (Q. Goodman, T. Goodman, T. Dawson, W. Robinson, White) (4:05)
 "Reality" (Q. Goodman, A. Goodman, C. Woods, G. Grice, J. Hunter, L. Hawkins, R. Jones) (4:12)
 "In the City" (Q. Goodman, T. Goodman, T. Dawson, D. Barton) (3:35)
 "People Round Town" (Q. Goodman, T. Goodman, T. Dawson, D. Barton) (3:50)
 "What U Feel" (D. Anderson, R. Myrick, R. Bailey) (3:40)

Personnel
 Pete Rock - scratches
 Marley Marl - recording, mixing, executive producer
 K-Def - mixing
 Frank Heller - mixing
 Carlton Batts - mastering
 Lawrence Goodman - executive producer
 Ann Goodman - executive producer
 Michael Miller - photography
 Sung-Lee Crawforth - art direction & design

References 

1994 albums
Da Youngsta's albums
East West Records albums
Atlantic Records albums
Albums produced by K-Def
Albums produced by Marley Marl